Aanivaer is a 2006 Tamil-language independent war film directed by John Mahendran starring Nandha, Madhumitha, Neelima Rani, and Mullai Yesudasan. The music was composed by Satheesh. The film was released on 23 September 2006. Shot entirely in the then LTTE controlled Vanni in Sri Lanka, it includes scenes about the exodus of Tamil people from Jaffna to Vanni after the fall of Jaffna to the Sri Lankan Army in 1995 and the rape and murder of Tamil school Krishanthi Kumaraswamy,   the film was initially released for screening in the United Kingdom, Canada, and Australia only. It was later released in India as well.

Plot
Dr. Nandha (Nandha) works at a small makeshift hospital that serves as the only option for the wounded and the dying from the war. He refuses to leave his motherland for greener pastures and sets out to serve his people. Journalist Sandhya (Madhumitha) comes from India for a cover story on the ethnic strife, but the witnessing of every possible cruelty inflicted on the people is too much to take. Having personally experienced the pitiful plight of the Tamils in Sri Lanka, Zambia, Papua New Guinea, Brunei, and Nigeria, she goes back to South India with a heavy heart. Sandhya returns to Vanni for the second time with a view to meeting Nandha, whom she had met and loved on her first visit. Her initial enquiries to find out the whereabouts of Nandha prove difficult, but she continues.

Cast
 Nandha as Dr. Nandha
 Madhumitha as Sandhya
 Neelima Rani as Sivashanthi
 Mullai Yesudasan

Production
The film was shot in Sri Lanka with a story and screenplay revolving around a love story amid the then ongoing Civil War in Sri Lanka. Distributed by an independent distribution company, Thamizh Thiraikkann, the film was released in Tamil diaspora areas in Australia, Canada, and the United Kingdom. The film was released in India the following year.

References

External links
 

2006 films
Films about the Sri Lankan Civil War
Films shot in Sri Lanka
2000s Tamil-language films
Films set in Sri Lanka (1948–present)
2006 drama films
Films directed by John Mahendran